Sa Sasucha is a 2010 Indian film in Marathi language directed by Kishor Pandurang Belekar and Starring Sonalee Kulkarni

Cast 
 Vinay Apte as Kartik's Father
 Arun Badsavle 
 Sunil Barve as Kartik
 Rajesh Bhosle
 Shubhangi Gokhale as Kartik's Mother (Sasu)
 Omkar Karve
 Yatin Karyekar as Shyamsunder
 Sonalee Kulkarni as Ashwini
 Vimal Mhatre 
 Kamlesh Sawant

References

External links